Nagybaracska (Croatian: Baračka) is a  village and municipality in Bács-Kiskun county, in the Southern Great Plain region of southern Hungary.

Geography

The famous Hungarian restaurant called Barka Csarda is located in Mohácsi u. 20, 6527. It is known worldwide for its fish soup and fantastic scenery

Demographics
  Magyars 
  Croats

References

Populated places in Bács-Kiskun County